Katja Shchekina ((b. May 18, 1986) is a Russian model.

Early life and career
Katja was born in 1986 in Perm, Russia to a Russian father and a mother of Komi and Hungarian descent.

Shchekina has appeared in Vogue Italia, Vogue Paris and Harpers Bazaar, and has been featured on the cover of L'Officiel (France & Russia). In addition, she has done advertisements for Dolce & Gabbana, Adidas, Juicy Couture, Neiman Marcus, and Bergdorf Goodman. She has also walked the runway for many top designers such as Givenchy, Alexander McQueen, La Perla, Etro, Oscar de la Renta, and Stella McCartney, as well as Victoria's Secret.

In 2008, after graduating, she married and had quit her modeling career.

References

External links
Fashion Model Directory profile
Katya at Style.com
Article in a Perm newspaper (Russian)
Claim she was born in Kudymkar (Russian)

1986 births
Living people
People from Perm, Russia
Russian female models
Russian people of Hungarian descent